Island View High School is a Canadian public high school located on 1853 Caldwell Road in Eastern Passage, Nova Scotia (Canada). Opening in Fall 2018, students attending the school were greeted by a large committee of other high schoolers, organized by Michelle Myers, Mrs. Lukenda and Ms. Walzak, The latter two also being the teacher heads of student council. Later in the month of September, Mr. Nigel Mailman, registrar and sports coordinator created polls where students voted on a school mascot, which was eventually decided to be the Island View High "Devils". School colours were  unveiled at the same time as the school logo, the colors being Green, Gray and Blue. The school was formally opened on October 4, 2018. With all students in attendance, the Minister of Education and Early Childhood Development, Zach Churchill as well as current and former local politicians attended.

Extracurricular activities

In addition to these sports programs, IVHS also offers a Debate Club, Student Council, Yearbook Club, a GSA .
Many band clubs are also being created such as, Concert Band, Jazz Band and Guitar Club

Chromebooks & Google apps
Island View High has a 1:1 student to chromebook ratio. Students are able to bring Chromebooks home and use them for a variety of tasks, Students are responsible to keep their chromebook in shape, and to charge them. Like other Nova Scotian schools students are given a gnspes account to log into their chromebooks with.

Programs available

For French Immersion students most classes are available in French with the exception of Band, Technology, Visual Arts, and of course English (ELA). 
O2 is offered at Island View as well.

References

High schools in Nova Scotia
Schools in Halifax, Nova Scotia